The Old Sartell Bridge is a bridge that spans the Mississippi River in the city of Sartell in the U.S. state of Minnesota. Though still standing, it is closed to traffic and was replaced by the Sartell Bridge constructed about 850 feet downstream. The bridge is around 1000 feet downstream of the Sartell Dam.  The bridge was built during a six-month period in 1914, but over the years the bridge became congested and less able to carry heavy traffic.  As early as 1957, heavy trucks were found to be too much for the span.  When the new bridge was built in 1984, the old bridge was used as a pedestrian footbridge, but it became impractical for this use since there was a factory at the east end.  The bridge now carries only utility lines.

The Old Sartell Bridge is a three span pin connected camelback through truss. The camelback design is a specific type of Parker truss, where the polygonal top chord is composed of exactly five sections. Each span of the Old Sartell Bridge is composed of six panels. The bridge is supported by concrete piers and abutments.

See also
List of crossings of the Upper Mississippi River

References
Historic Bridges of Michigan and Elsewhere - Provides identification information used to identify the Old Sartell Bridge.
 

Bridges completed in 1914
Bridges over the Mississippi River
Buildings and structures in Benton County, Minnesota
Buildings and structures in Stearns County, Minnesota
Former road bridges in Minnesota
Sartell, Minnesota
Transportation in Benton County, Minnesota
Transportation in Stearns County, Minnesota
Parker truss bridges in the United States